Montreal Bar may refer to:
Bar of Montreal, group of lawyers
Montreal Bar, former name of Big Bar, Butte County, California